Joshua R. Haeder (born September 19, 1980) is an American businessman and politician from the state of South Dakota. He is the South Dakota State Treasurer.

Haeder is from Huron, South Dakota. Prior to being elected South Dakota's 33rd state treasurer, Josh Haeder was the managing partner of Haeder Organization, LLC based in Huron, SD. Haeder Organization is a property management and real estate investment company. Haeder served  years as the Northeast Director for U.S. Senator Mike Rounds who is a member of the Banking Committee.

Haeder's experience includes time as the chief operating officer for a national, non-profit credit counseling agency that assists individuals and families considering bankruptcy. He also spent several years in business and agricultural banking management. Haeder's education includes a B.S. in Public Safety Management and a M.A. in Intelligence and Global Security.

Haeder and his wife Amanda have two young daughters at home, Maggie and Laikyn. In his spare time, Haeder is a public address announcer for sporting activities, enjoys practicing mixed martial arts, pheasant hunting, fishing and watching Minnesota Twins baseball.

Political career
He served as a regional director for U.S. Senator Mike Rounds.

2018 State Treasurer Election
In the 2018 elections, Haeder ran for South Dakota State Treasurer. He won the election with 62% of the vote, defeating Democrat Aaron Matson.

References

External links

1980 births
Capella University alumni
Living people
People from Huron, South Dakota
Point Park University alumni
Political staffers
South Dakota Republicans